Hopea recopei is a species of plant in the family Dipterocarpaceae. It is found in Cambodia, Laos, Thailand, and Vietnam. 

A sample collected by J.B.L. Pierre in March 1867 is stored in the Kew Herbarium.

References

recopei
Endangered plants
Taxonomy articles created by Polbot